Joy Johnson (1926 – 2013) was an American marathon runner.

Johnson ran 25 times in the New York City Marathon.  She holds the record as the oldest female finisher in the event.

She did not begin running until age 59 and was a high school teacher.

References

1926 births
2013 deaths
American female long-distance runners
21st-century American women
20th-century American women